Cake: A Wedding Story is a 2007 comedy film directed by Will Wallace. The film hit the festival circuit in March 2007 with its world premiere at The Other Venice Film Festival on March 18, followed by a March 24 bow at the 2007 AFI Dallas International Film Festival.

Plot
When two star-crossed lovers, set on eloping, are forced into having a big wedding, the bride develops a plan of her own. Unfortunately, the groom is not privy to the plan. Meanwhile, family and friends start to take sides at a reception for a wedding that never took place.

Cast
G. W. Bailey as Howard Canter
Thomas Calabro as Bernard
William Zabka as Sam
Catherine Anderson Martin as Juliet Willoughby
Adam Green as Felix Canter
Mary Ellen Trainor as Jane Andrews
Will Wallace as Ted Andrews
Joe Estevez as Ken Willoughby
Kerry Wallum as brother in law
Dominic Scott Kay as Ryan
Burton Gilliam as Judge
Ann Cusack as Celeste
Joe Stevens as Bip Saxton
Becky Jane Romine as Gretchen Willoughby
Marjorie Clifton as Liz Willoughby
Craig Syracusa as Alex
Matt Pletcher as Father Matthew (as Matthew S. Harrison)
Teresa Castle as Kathy
Sara Gravrock as Penny
Alexis Ashley as Patience
Luke Coffee as Jimmy Z
Jason Manns as Bret
Nikki Boyer as Nurse
Bob Farster as Art
Tom McCafferty as Mike
Brad MacDonald as Tom
Brave Matthews as 1 Year Old Stud's Dad
Nick Pellegrino as Rabbi
Sara Gibbons as Cat
Lily Asinovsky as Jeanne

References

External links
 
 Cake: A Wedding Story on Myspace
 AFI Dallas
 Baby Galigo Studios

2007 films
2007 romantic comedy films
2000s English-language films
Films directed by Will Wallace